Estádio da Tapadinha is a football stadium located in Lisbon, Portugal. With a seating capacity up to 4,000 people, it is the home ground of both Atlético Clube de Portugal and Benfica women's football team.

Construction 
Prior to 1925 Benfica lent its pitch to Carcavelinhos. That year, the Benfica Board decided to end the lease at the end of the season, forcing Carcavelinhos to find another pitch.

The Board of Carcavelinhos decided to construct its own pitch and locate it next to the Alvito quarry, in Alcântara.

António Faustino conceived the Campo da Tapadinha, with help from Sousa Lino and Rodrigues Graça. The construction was managed by the members and athletes of Carcavelinhos, and the field was inaugurated on June 26, 1926. The inaugural game was between Carcavelinhos and Sporting, and ended with a 4-3 victory for the "Lions". The first goal was made by Carlos Domingues, forward for Carcavelinhos.

Increase of the stands: The Stadium 
The idea for the transformation of the Campo da Tapadinha was put to the respective board by its president, Joaquim de Paiva e Silva, at a meeting held on February 14, 1944. The program of works was unanimously accepted, as well as the proposal for a possible purchase of the land.

The board that approved the preliminary project of the works elaborated by Engineer Manuel Travassos Valdez, was constituted as follows: Joaquim de Paiva e Silva, Lieutenant Alcino Pires, Alfredo Viçoso, Carlos Casanova, João do Carmo Miguel, António J. Marques and Franklin Marques .

To assist in the study and preparation of the project, a commission was set up, which included Joaquim de Paiva e Silva, Jaime Franco, Dr. Hermano Leite, Joaquim Nobre, Álvaro Cardoso, Amaral de Almeida, Armando Esteves and Álvaro de Azevedo. The preliminary project was presented to the press at a meeting held at the Club Secretariat on April 28, 1944.

The full compliance of the project, at that time, totaled 2500000 escudos, being included 10 more steps in the associates and regular stands, swimming pool, roof of the central stand, skating, etc.

The primitive project was entered in the Municipality of Lisbon on October 17, 1944, being later withdrawn for convenience of the expansion designed, to reenter with final character on May 9, 1945.

The rolling of the field began on September 3, 1945. Only the harvester, whose work was entrusted to the Agricultural Engineer João Marques de Almeida, imported in about 1500000 escudos.

The works, excluding the harvester, began on July 5, 1945.

The Executive Committee of the Works, elected on March 6, 1945, consisted of Joaquim de Paiva e Silva, Joaquim Nobre and Álvaro Cardoso, this as field director. The construction was entrusted to the author of the project - Engineer Travassos Valdez.

The inauguration of the Estádio da Tapadinha took place on September 23, 1945, with the presence of the Head of State, Marechal Óscar Carmona. A friendly game between Atlético and Sporting was disputed, that ended with the victory of the green-and-white by six balls to zero.

Its capacity has reached the 10000 places, being at the moment reduced to the 4000, fruit of the closing of one of the stands and the pawn.

References

Football venues in Portugal
Sports venues in Lisbon
Sports venues completed in 1926

Atlético Clube de Portugal